Mozaffar Ajali (born 30 December 1962) is an Iranian weightlifter. He competed in the 1992 Summer Olympics.

References

External links
 

1962 births
Living people
Weightlifters at the 1992 Summer Olympics
Iranian male weightlifters
Olympic weightlifters of Iran
20th-century Iranian people